6-Chloro-5-ethoxy-N-(pyridin-2-yl)indoline-1-carboxamide (CEPC) is a drug which acts as a potent and selective antagonist for the serotonin 5-HT2C receptor. In animal studies it was found to potentiate the conditioned place preference induced by low-dose amphetamine, demonstrating that 5-HT2C-mediated disinhibition of dopamine release can cause interactions with dopaminergic drugs.

See also 
 RS-102,221
 SB-242,084

References 

5-HT2C antagonists